James Dick is also the WWE ring name of John Toland

James Dick (1743–1828) was born in Forres, Morayshire to Alexander, a shoemaker and town councillor.  Dick became a successful merchant in the West Indies and later in London. Following his death, he bequeathed £113,787 to encourage "learning and efficient teaching" among the parish schoolmasters of Elgin, Banff, and Aberdeen shires. This fund is known as the Dick Bequest, and awards continue to be made to school boards in the region.

Career
Dick grew up in a house in Forres High Street.  In the summer months, he herded cattle and during the rest of the year he received his education at Rafford grammar school about 3 miles from Forres.  His father employed him as his bookkeeper and it was during this time that Dick wished to marry the family's household servant.  Because his parents objected to this, Dick left home at the age of nineteen for the West Indies.  He settled in Kingston, Jamaica where he became a clerk in a merchant house.  Along with his brother John Dick, he set up a business importing colonial produce into London.  After twenty years, he transferred his share of the business to his brother and returned to London a very wealthy man.  Dick's brother John sold the business when he retired and returned to Scotland but suddenly fell ill in and died.  James inherited his fortune.

Philanthropist
After providing for his daughter, Dick left over £113,000 in his will with instructions for the setting up of a bequest fund to help the schoolmasters and schools in Aberdeenshire, Banffshire and Morayshire.

Most of the masters were arts graduates who taught only while they waited for a career in the church.  Dick's vision was that the most learned of these would be encouraged to stay in education for the benefit of both themselves and the children they taught.  By 1833 the endowment yielded between £3300 and £5500 annually and had grown to around £200,000.  The fund was administered by trustees belonging to the Society of Writers to the Signet.  Applicants were rigorously examined for suitability and were required to be proficient in teaching classical languages, humanities, mathematics and science; those who were successful doubled their salaries.  The Education (Scotland) Act 1872 changed the way in which the grants were dispensed by ensuring that endowments were transferred to school boards.  The Royal Commissioners in their third report on endowed schools stated

From 1856 to 1907, Simon Somerville Laurie was Secretary to the Dick Bequest.

In Forres in 1928, a group of beneficiaries from the fund marked the anniversary of Dick's death by the erection of a memorial.

Notes

External links
 Description of the Dick Bequest, Moray Council

1743 births
1828 deaths
West Indies merchants
People from Moray
Scottish philanthropists